Bénédicte Dorfman-Luzuy (born 2 December 1970 in Bordeaux) is a French rower. She is married to fellow rower Xavier Dorfman.

References 

 

1970 births
Living people
French female rowers
Sportspeople from Bordeaux
Rowers at the 2000 Summer Olympics
Olympic rowers of France
World Rowing Championships medalists for France
20th-century French women
21st-century French women